Brian Fletcher is an American lawyer who served as the Principal Deputy Solicitor General of the United States. He served as Acting Solicitor General from August 11, 2021, until Elizabeth Prelogar's confirmation on October 21, 2021.

Early life and education 
Fletcher graduated from Valley High School in West Des Moines, Iowa, where he was the runner-up of the 1997 Tournament of Champions in Lincoln–Douglas debate and a two-time Iowa state debate champion. He then graduated magna cum laude from Yale University with a degree in Ethics, Politics and Economics. At Yale, Fletcher competed in the American Parliamentary Debate Association, winning the national championship and the awards for the top individual speaker and the top team in 2001. Fletcher next attended Harvard Law School, graduating summa cum laude. At Harvard, Fletcher won the Fay Diploma as the top student in his class over the course of law school, won the Sears Prize as one of the top two students of both his first and second years, and served as president of the Harvard Law Review.

Career 
Fletcher began his career as a judicial clerk for Judge Merrick Garland of the United States Court of Appeals for the District of Columbia Circuit. He then clerked for Justice Ruth Bader Ginsburg of the Supreme Court of the United States.

From 2011 to 2013, Fletcher served as an associate White House Counsel in the Barack Obama administration. He then practiced appellate litigation at Wilmer Cutler Pickering Hale and Dorr before joining the Office of the Solicitor General.  As an assistant Solicitor General, Fletcher argued thirteen cases before the Supreme Court and won the Attorney General's Award for Distinguished Service. After five years at the Office of the Solicitor General, Fletcher joined the faculty of Stanford Law School, co-directing the law school's Supreme Court Litigation Clinic and being an associate professor.

At the beginning of the Joe Biden administration, Fletcher joined the United States Department of Justice as counsel to now-Attorney General Merrick Garland. On August 11, 2021, Fletcher began serving as acting Solicitor General of the United States while Elizabeth Prelogar awaited confirmation. On October 28, 2021, Prelogar became Solicitor General following her confirmation, and Fletcher began working as her Principal Deputy.

See also 
 List of law clerks of the Supreme Court of the United States (Seat 6)

References 

American lawyers
Yale College alumni
Harvard Law School alumni
United States Solicitors General
United States Department of Justice lawyers
Year of birth missing (living people)
Living people